William Parry Murphy (Stoughton, Wisconsin, February 6, 1892 – October 9, 1987) was an American physician who shared the Nobel Prize in Physiology or Medicine in 1934 with George Richards Minot and George Hoyt Whipple for their combined work in devising and treating macrocytic anemia (specifically, pernicious anemia).

Murphy was born on February 6, 1892, at Stoughton, Wisconsin and moved to Condon, Oregon as a youth. He was educated at the public schools of Wisconsin and Oregon. He completed his A.B. degree in 1914 from the University of Oregon. He completed his M.D. in 1922 from Harvard Medical School.

In 1924, Murphy bled dogs to make them anemic (work inspired by war injury work), and then fed them various substances to gauge their improvement. He discovered that ingesting large amounts of liver seemed to restore anemia more quickly of all foods. Minot and Whipple then set about to chemically isolate the curative substance. These investigations showed that iron in the liver was responsible for curing anemia from bleeding, but meanwhile liver had been tried on people with pernicious anemia and some effect as seen there, also. The active ingredient in this case, found serendipitously, was not iron, but rather a water-soluble extract containing a new substance. From this extract, chemists were ultimately were able to isolate vitamin B12 from the liver. Even before the vitamin had been completely characterized, the knowledge that raw liver and its extracts treated pernicious anemia (previously a terminal disease) was a major advance in medicine.

In 1930, Murphy was awarded the Cameron Prize for Therapeutics of the University of Edinburgh with George Minot.

Murphy married Pearl Harriett Adams (died 1980) on September 10, 1919. They had a son, William P. Murphy Jr., and a daughter, Priscilla Adams.

In 1951, Murphy was one of seven Nobel Laureates who attended the 1st Lindau Nobel Laureate Meeting.

References

External links
William Parry Murphy papers, 1906-1987 (inclusive), 1919-1987 (bulk), HMS c284. Harvard Medical Library, Francis A. Countway Library of Medicine, Center for the History of Medicine, Harvard Medical School
  including the Nobel Lecture, December 12, 1934 Pernicious Anemia

1892 births
1987 deaths
Harvard Medical School alumni
Harvard University faculty
University of Oregon alumni
Nobel laureates in Physiology or Medicine
American Nobel laureates
People from Stoughton, Wisconsin
Physicians from Oregon
People from Condon, Oregon
Vitamin researchers